Billy Martin (born May 25, 1967), formerly Poppy Z. Brite, is an American author. He initially achieved fame in the gothic horror genre of literature in the early 1990s by publishing a string of successful novels and short story collections. He is best known for his novels Lost Souls (1992), Drawing Blood (1993), and Exquisite Corpse (1996). His later work moved into the genre of dark comedy, with many stories set in the New Orleans restaurant world. Martin's novels are typically standalone books but may feature recurring characters from previous novels and short stories. Much of his work features openly bisexual and gay characters.

Career 
Martin is best known for writing gothic and horror novels and short stories. His trademarks include featuring gay men as main characters, graphic sexual descriptions, and an often wry treatment of gruesome events. Some of Martin's better known novels include Lost Souls (1992), Drawing Blood (1993), and the controversial serial killer novel Exquisite Corpse (1996); he has also released the short fiction collections Wormwood (originally published as Swamp Foetus; 1993), Are You Loathsome Tonight? (also published as Self-Made Man; 1998), Wrong Things (with Caitlin R. Kiernan; 2001), and The Devil You Know (2003). His "Calcutta: Lord of Nerves" was selected to represent the year 1992 in the story anthology The Century's Best Horror Fiction.

In a 1998 interview, in response to a comment that "Growing up in the American South [shaped him] as a writer", Martin mentioned that Southern writers Carson McCullers, Truman Capote, Tennessee Williams, Flannery O'Connor, Harper Lee, Thomas Wolfe and William Faulkner also influenced his writing. Answering a follow-up question about his literary influences, he also included "Bradbury, Nabokov, W.S. Burroughs, Stephen King, Ramsey Campbell, Shirley Jackson, Thomas Ligotti, Kathe Koja, Dennis Cooper, Dorothy Parker, Dylan Thomas, Harlan Ellison, Peter Straub, Paul Theroux, Baudelaire, Poe, Lovecraft, John Lennon... I could rattle off ten or twenty more easily; they're all in there somewhere."

Martin wrote Courtney Love: The Real Story (1997), a biography of singer Courtney Love that was officially "unauthorized", but he acknowledged that the work was done at Love's suggestion and with her cooperation, including access to Love's personal journal and letters.

In the late 1990s and early 2000s, Martin moved away from horror fiction and gothic themes while still writing about gay characters. The critically acclaimed Liquor novels—Liquor (2004), Prime (2005), and Soul Kitchen (2006)—are dark comedies set in the New Orleans restaurant world. The Value of X (2002) depicts the beginning of the careers of the protagonists of the Liquor series—Gary "G-Man" Stubbs and John "Rickey" Rickey; other stories, including several in his most recent collection The Devil You Know (2003) and the novella D*U*C*K, chronicle events in the lives of the extended Stubbs family, a Catholic clan whose roots are sunk deep in the traditional culture of New Orleans. Martin hopes to eventually write three more novels in the Liquor series, tentatively titled Dead Shrimp Blues, Hurricane Stew, and Double Shot. However, in late 2006, he ceased publishing with Three Rivers Press, the trade paperback division of Random House that published the first three Liquor novels, and is currently taking a hiatus from fiction writing. He has described Antediluvian Tales, a short story collection published by Subterranean Press in November 2007, as "if not my last book ever, then my last one for some time." He still writes short non-fiction pieces, including guest editorials for the New Orleans Times-Picayune and a food article for Chile Pepper Magazine.

Martin has often stated that, while he will allow some of his work to be optioned for film under the right circumstances, he has little interest in movies and is not overly eager to see his work filmed. In 1999, his short story The Sixth Sentinel (filmed as The Dream Sentinel) made up one segment of episode 209 of The Hunger, a short-lived horror anthology series on Showtime.

Critical essays on Martin's fiction appear in Supernatural Fiction Writers: Contemporary Fantasy and Horror (2003) by Brian Stableford and The Evolution of the Weird Tale (2004) by S. T. Joshi.

On June 9, 2010, Martin officially stated that he was retired from writing, in a post entitled "I'm Basically Retired (For Now)" on his Livejournal. He stated that he had "completely lost the ability to interact with [his] body of work" and then went on to state that business issues were a partial cause. He also specifically mentioned being unable to disconnect from aspects of his life relating to Hurricane Katrina. He ended his statement by saying that he missed having relationships with his characters and that he did not feel the need to write for publication. Martin has since created a series of artworks themed on New Orleans and voodoo.

In 2018, Martin announced he had returned to writing with a non-fiction project entitled Water If God Wills It: Religion and Spirituality In The Work of Stephen King.

Personal life 
Martin was born in Bowling Green, Warren County, Kentucky, at Western University Hospital. He is a trans man and has written and talked extensively about transgender issues and his own gender dysphoria. He is gay, and has said, "Ever since I was old enough to know what gay men were, I've considered myself a gay man that happens to have been born in a female body, and that's the perspective I'm coming from." In 2003, Martin wrote that, while gender theorists like Kate Bornstein would call him a "nonoperative transsexual", Martin would not insist on a label, writing "I'm just me". In 2010, he began hormone therapy, and in 2011 expressed that he would prefer to be referred to by male pronouns.

On January 6, 2009, Martin was arrested at Our Lady of Good Counsel Church in New Orleans as part of a peaceful demonstration in which churches in the Uptown area of the city were occupied to protest their closings. In August 2009, New Orleans's Gambit Weekly publication published reader-poll results naming Martin in second place as an ever-popular "Best Local Author."

Bibliography

Novels and novellas 
Lost Souls (1992)
Drawing Blood (1993)
Exquisite Corpse (1996)
The Crow: The Lazarus Heart (1998)
"Plastic Jesus" (novella; 2000)
 The Liquor series:
The Value of X (2002)
Liquor (2004)
Prime (2005)
Soul Kitchen (2006)
D*U*C*K (novella; 2007)
Triads (with Christa Faust; 2004)
Second Line (2009)

Short story collections 
Wormwood (also published in limited edition and in the UK under author's original title as Swamp Foetus; 1993)
His Mouth Will Taste of Wormwood and Other Stories ("Four stories of contemporary horror", selected from Wormwood; Penguin 60s, 1995)
Are You Loathsome Tonight? (also published in the UK as Self-Made Man; 1998)
Wrong Things (with Caitlin R. Kiernan; 2001)
The Devil You Know (2003)
Antediluvian Tales (2007)

Anthologies (as editor) 
Love in Vein
Twice Bitten (Love in Vein II)

Short stories 
N.B.: Most of these were originally published as chapbooks.
"Are You Loathsome Tonight?" (short biographical story of Elvis Presley, published in Are You Loathsome Tonight?, 1998 (also titled Self-Made Man) and reprinted in The Children of Cthulhu, 2002)
"R.I.P." (1998)
"The Seed of Lost Souls" (1999)
"Stay Awake" (2000)
"Lantern Marsh" (2000) (first published in October Dreams)
"Would You?" (2000)
"Pansu" (2001)
"Con Party at Hotel California" (2002)
"The Feast of St. Rosalie" (2003)
"Used Stories" (2004)
"Crown of Thorns" (2005)
"Liquor for Christmas" (2007)
"The H.O.G. Syndrome" (Martin's first "novel", about 9000 words, written at age 12; 2007)

Non-fiction 
Courtney Love: The Real Story (biography, 1997)
Guilty But Insane (essays, 2001)

Uncollected short fiction 
"Vine of the Soul" (appeared in Disco 2000, 1998)
"The Freaks (juvenilia)" (The Spook #12, 2002; also appears on Martin's website along with other early/unpublished fiction)
"Fuck It, We're Going To Jamaica!" (webzine Necromantic; also appears on Martin's website)
"The Curious Case of Miss Violet Stone (1894)" (co-written with David Ferguson; Shadows Over Baker Street, 2003; Ballantine Books)
"Wandering the Borderlands" (Masques V, 2006; Gauntlet Press)
"System Freeze" (Matrix webcomic, illustrated by Dave Dorman and published in The Matrix Comics volume 2)
"The Gulf" (Subterranean: Tales of Dark Fantasy, 2008; Subterranean Press)

See also
List of horror fiction writers

Notes 

1967 births
Living people
American bloggers
American fantasy writers
20th-century American novelists
American food writers
American gay writers
Dark fantasy writers
Writers from New Orleans
Transgender men
Transgender novelists
American horror novelists
21st-century American novelists
American male novelists
LGBT people from Kentucky
20th-century American male writers
21st-century American male writers
Novelists from Louisiana
20th-century American non-fiction writers
21st-century American non-fiction writers
American male non-fiction writers
Writers of Gothic fiction
American male bloggers
American LGBT novelists
People from Bowling Green, Kentucky
Writers from Kentucky
Weird fiction writers
20th-century pseudonymous writers
21st-century pseudonymous writers
American transgender writers